Micah Lancaster (born February 20, 1984) is an American former professional basketball player and current sports trainer, specializing in basketball skill development.

He has worked with players at all levels including Kobe Bryant for an event with the London School of Basketball and most recently worked with Dwyane Wade, Mario Chalmers, Kyrie Irving, Evan Turner and Nolan Smith. He is the founder of I’m Possible Training, a training company based in Raleigh-Durham, North Carolina.

High school career

His high school basketball career started as a  freshman. Lancaster played junior varsity as a freshman and as a  sophomore moved to varsity for one game then was moved back down. As a junior, during his first varsity game he tore the cartilage in his left knee on first play of the game, which caused difficulties through the remainder of the season. After his junior year he was cut from two AAU teams, and a third team would not let him try out.

As a  all-state senior, he led his team to state class B Michigan semi-finals while averaging 30 points per game in the state tourney. In one state tournament game he scored 45 points against East Grand Rapids which included a game-winning shot at buzzer.

College and professional career

After accepting a scholarship to Spring Arbor University, Lancaster became a NAIA Division II All-American for three years. He scored 2398, second all-time and achieved 751 assists, first all-time leader for the university. He holds the Spring Arbor record for the most free throws attempted and made them two-time Christian college champions. Lancaster was selected all-conference in his freshman season and was named as WHAC conference rookie of the year.  He also achieved 1st team all-conference as sophomore. He led the conference in scoring and assists as well as junior year first team all-conference in MCC where he led in scoring and assists. He was named to first-team all-conference during his senior year and had career-high point game totals of 42 and 41.

In 2007, Lancaster played professionally for Grand Rapids Flight in the International Basketball League.

Training system
Lancaster then focused on personal basketball training. The training system is combination of online individual workouts and gym workouts at centers across the United States with certified trainers teaching Micah's basketball curriculum.
Micah specializes in "skill development" training, which he repeatedly states is not what a player's entire training regimen should consist of, but that it definitely deserves attention in his or her game. Micah encourages players to learn as many different ways to train, so that they may figure out what works best for them as a unique individual. I'm Possible utilizes innovative tools to make basketball training more game like and realistic, such as rip cones, med balls, and foams rollers.

Company overview

In 2009, Lancaster founded I’m Possible Training to provide intensive, organized workouts. The program is a year-round training system with training centers across the United States. I'm Possible Training also provides basketballs services including camps, training academies, clinics, private training, and motivational speaking.

References

External links
 Micah Lancaster Official site
 I'm Possible Training Official site

1984 births
Living people
American men's basketball players
Place of birth missing (living people)
People from Kent County, Michigan
Spring Arbor Cougars men's basketball players
Guards (basketball)